Edwin Sidney Hartland (1848–1927) was an author of works on folklore.

His works include anthologies of tales, and theories on anthropology and mythology with an ethnological perspective. He believed that the assembling and study of persistent and widespread folklore provided a scientific insight into custom and belief. Hartland was president of the Folklore Society, 1899–1901, and contributed to its journal Folk-Lore; his earlier contributions included a dispute with Andrew Lang.

Hartland was born in Islington, eventually making his career as a solicitor in Swansea. His father, E. J. Hartland, was a congregational minister. Throughout his life he served in many judicial positions and on public committees in Swansea and at Gloucester, and took a particular interest in education.

References

External links

 
 
 

English folklorists
1848 births
1927 deaths
Presidents of the Folklore Society